Furious 7: Original Motion Picture Score is the soundtrack to the film of the same name. The score was composed by Brian Tyler. The album, with a total of 28 tracks, was released on CD and digital distribution by Back Lot Music on March 31, 2015 with 76 minutes and 42 seconds' worth of music.

When discussing the creation of the score, Tyler explained: "It was a pleasure to collaborate with James [Wan] on Furious 7, as he wanted the emotion of the themes to be the primary focus. The music uses modern recording techniques, vintage modular synthesizers, mashed-up beats, drums and tweaked remix elements along with classic film scoring traditions including full orchestra, piano, voice and classical guitar. I am so proud of the movie, and I dedicate the score to the memory of Paul Walker and all the joy he brought."

In describing Tyler's score, Wan remarked, "Brian's amazing score gave this movie life. He did an incredible job of crafting an electrifying score for the bombastic action moments, one that is balanced by the beautiful and emotional themes of the characters that underline the heart of this movie."

Track listing
All music in the score is composed and conducted by Brian Tyler. Additional music is conducted by Arturo Rodriques.

References

2015 soundtrack albums
Fast & Furious albums
Back Lot Music soundtracks
Brian Tyler soundtracks
Action film soundtracks
Thriller film soundtracks